Jean-Baptiste Antoine Marcelin Marbot (18 August 1782 – 16 November 1854), known as Marcellin Marbot, was a French general, famous for his memoirs depicting the Napoleonic age of warfare. He belongs to a family that has distinguished itself particularly in the career of arms, giving three generals to France in less than 50 years. His elder brother, Antoine Adolphe Marcelin Marbot, was also a military man of some note.

Biography

Early life 
Jean-Baptiste Antoine Marcelin Marbot was born into a family of military nobility in Altillac, in the ancient province of Quercy in southwestern France. He was the younger son of General Jean-Antoine Marbot, former aide-de-camp to Lieutenant-Général de Schomberg, inspector general of the cavalry within the Military household of the king of France.

After studying at the Sorèze Military College (1793–1798), he joined the 1st Hussards Regiment as a volunteer on 3 September 1799. He served under General Jean-Mathieu Seras, who promoted him to the rank of sergeant on 1 December 1799. In the same month, on 31 December 1799, he was promoted to the rank of second lieutenant in recognition of his courage. He fought with the Army of Italy and took part in the Battle of Marengo and the Siege of Genoa, during which his father, General Jean-Antoine Marbot died.

Having returned to France, he joined the 25th Chasseur Regiment on 11 June 1801 and was detached to the School of Cavalry at Versailles.

Napoleonic wars 
He became aide-de-camp to General Pierre Augereau on 31 August 1803 and was promoted to the rank of lieutenant on 11 July 1804. During the war against the Kingdom of Prussia and the Russian Empire between 1806 and 1807, he fought in the VII corps of the Grande Armée. Having distinguished himself at the Battle of Austerlitz, he was promoted to the rank of captain on 3 January 1807. The following month, he took part in the Battle of Eylau, during the course of which he nearly lost his life. After this he served in the Peninsular War under Marshals Jean Lannes and André Masséna, and showed himself to be a dashing leader of light cavalry in the Russian campaign of 1812.

On 15 November 1812 he was promoted to the rank of colonel and took part in the German campaign of 1813 as the commander of a cavalry regiment. During the morning of the first day of the Battle of Leipzig, Marbot nearly changed the course of the entire war when his regiment came close to capturing the Tsar of Russia, Alexander I and the King of Prussia, Frederick William III, as they had strayed from their escort. After a slow recovery from the wounds he had received at the battles of Leipzig and Hanau, he took part in the Battle of Waterloo alongside Emperor Napoleon I during the Hundred Days.

After the final defeat of Napoleon in 1815, he was exiled during the first years of the Bourbon Restoration and only returned to France in 1819.

July Monarchy 

During the July Monarchy, his intimacy with King Louis Philippe I and his son, Prince Ferdinand Philippe of Orléans secured him important military positions. He was promoted to the rank of maréchal de camp (brigadier general), and in this rank he was present at the Siege of Antwerp in 1832.

From 1835 to 1840 he served in various Algerian expeditions, and was promoted to the rank of lieutenant-général (divisional general) in 1836. In 1845 he was made a member of the Chamber of Peers. Three years later, at the fall of King Louis Philippe I, he retired into private life.

Family 

His father, General Jean-Antoine Marbot, had four sons, only two whom reached adulthood: Antoine Adolphe Marcelin, the elder, maréchal de camp (brigadier general) during the July Monarchy, and Jean-Baptiste Antoine Marcelin, the younger. Through his mother, he was the cousin of François Certain de Canrobert, marshal of France during the Second French Empire.

On 5 November 1811, he married Angélique Marie Caroline Personne-Desbrières (1790–1873), and by this alliance became the owner of the Château du Rancy in Bonneuil-sur-Marne. They had two sons:

 Adolphe Charles Alfred, known as Alfred (1812–1865): Master of Requests to the Council of State, uniformologist and painter.
 Charles Nicolas Marcelin, known as Charles (1820–1882): Whose daughter Marguerite first published her grandfather's famous Memoirs.

Decorations 

Marbot received the following decorations:

 French Empire
 National Order of the Legion of Honour:
  Knight: 16 October 1808.
  Officer: 28 September 1813.

 Kingdom of France
 Royal and Military Order of Saint Louis:
  Knight: 6 June 1827.

 Kingdom of France
 Royal Order of the Legion of Honour:
  Commander: 21 March 1831.
  Grand Officer: 30 April 1836.

 Kingdom of Belgium
 Order of Leopold:
  Commander: 10 March 1833.

 Grand Duchy of Luxembourg
 Order of the Oak Crown:
  Grand Cross: 9 September 1842.

Wounds and injuries 
Marbot endured 13 wounds and injuries during his service:

 A bayonet stab to the left arm, received while he was left stunned by the "wind" of a cannonball that had just flown through his bicorn hat, at the Battle of Eylau: 8 February 1807.
 A sword slash to the forehead at Ágreda: 1 November 1808.
 A gunshot through the upper body at the Siege of Zaragoza: 9 February 1809.
 A gunshot to the right thigh at the Battle of Essling: 22 May 1809.
 A gunshot to the left wrist at the Battle of Znaim: 12 July 1809.
 A sword slash to the face and a sword stab to the belly at the Battle of Casal Novo: 14 March 1811.
 A gunshot to the left shoulder at the Battle of Klyastitsy: 31 July 1812.
 A lance stab to the right knee at Plieščanicy: 4 December 1812.
 An arrow hit to the right thigh (fired by Russia's Bashkir horse archers) at the Battle of Leipzig: 18 October 1813.
 A lance stab to the chest at the Battle of Waterloo: 18 June 1815.
 A gunshot to the left knee at Médéa during the Algerian expedition: 12 May 1840.

Literary works

Publications 

In exile after Battle of Waterloo, Marbot returned to France in 1819 and wrote two books:

 Critical remarks on the work of Lieutenant-Général Rogniat, entitled: Considerations on the art of war (1820).
 On the necessity of increasing the military forces of France; means of achieving this in the most cost-efficient way possible (1825).

The first publication was a reply to General Joseph Rogniat’s treatise on war, in which Marbot effectively contrasted the human factor in war with Rogniat’s pure theory. The second presented his recommendations for the future development of the French Armed Forces.

Napoleon read the first publication while in exile on the island of Saint Helena. His aide-de-camp, General Henri-Gatien Bertrand recorded in his diary on 14 March 1821:

In the evening, the Emperor handed me Marbot's book, [...] and said: "That is the best book I have read for four years. It is the one that has given me the greatest amount of pleasure. [...] He has expressed some things better than I did, he was more familiar with them because, on the whole, he was more of a Corps commander than I. [...] Throughout the book he never refers to 'the Emperor'. He wanted the King of France (Louis XVIII) to give him an appointment with the rank of Colonel; that is quite obvious. He uses 'Emperor' once, so as not to look as though he were afraid to do so, or to appear cowardly, and another time he uses 'Napoleon'. He mentions Masséna and Augereau frequently, and he has described the Battle of Essling better than I could have done it myself [...]. I should have liked to show Marbot my appreciation by sending him a ring. If I ever return to active life, I will have him attached to me as an aide-de-camp [...].

This publication earned Marbot the distinction of being remembered in Napoleon's will:

To Colonel Marbot, one hundred thousand francs. I recommend him to continue to write in defense of the glory of the French armies, and to confound their calumniators and apostates.

Memoirs 

His fame rests chiefly on the Memoirs of his life and campaigns, the Memoirs of General Baron de Marbot, which were written for his children and published posthumously in Paris, in 1891. An English translation by Arthur John Butler was published in London, in 1892. Marbot’s Memoirs were widely acclaimed, and Arthur Conan Doyle wrote of them:

The first of all soldier books in the world. [...] There are few books which I could not spare from my shelves better than the Memoirs of the gallant Marbot.

Literary references 
Several authors and personalities have cited Marbot and his Memoirs in their works:

 Andrew Lang's collections of stories written by various authors feature selected excerpts from Marbot's Memoirs. Three appear in The Red True Story Book collection (1895): "Marbot's March", "Eylau. The Mare Lisette" and "How Marbot crossed the Danube". Another two appear in The All Sorts of Stories Book collection (1911): "How the Russian Soldier was Saved" and "Marbot and the Young Cossack".
 In Arthur Conan Doyle's novel Through the Magic Door (1907), the author shares his admiration for Marbot's Memoirs with his readers. Doyle also modelled the fictional comedic character of Brigadier Gerard, the most entertaining of all his characters, on a number of real-life sources from the Napoleonic era, among them Marbot.
 In Theodore Roosevelt's writings and public statements, Marbot is cited on two occasions. He is mentioned in Roosevelt's address Biological Analogies in History (1910), delivered at the University of Oxford, and in his publication A Book Lover's Holiday in the Open (1916).
 In Virginia Woolf's novel Mrs Dalloway (1925), there are several mentions of the protagonist Clarissa Dalloway reading Marbot's Memoirs.
 As with a number of other historical figures, Marbot appears prominently in the Riverworld cycle of science-fiction novels (1967-1983) by Philip José Farmer. Marbot is first featured as the commander of Marines on Sam Clemens' riverboat, the Not for Hire. After the destruction of that boat and the death of its captain, Marbot joins the group led by famed English explorer Sir Richard Francis Burton and accompanies him on the journey to the head of the River. Accompanied by his lover, the English author Aphra Behn, Marbot reaches the Tower at the head of the River, only to die in combat when androids based on characters from Alice Through the Looking-Glass attack the guests during a Lewis Carroll-themed party.
 In Marc Bloch's book The Historian's Craft (1949), he uses the story of Marbot crossing the Danube, along with various documentary evidence, as an example of historical criticism unearthing erroneous history-writing, citing sources as wide-ranging as the Commentaries of Julius Caesar and the Protocols of the Elders of Zion.
 In Ronald Frederick Delderfield's novel To Serve Them All My Days (1972), the protagonist David Powlett-Jones gets comfort from Marbot's Memoirs during his time in the trenches, and again on the death of his wife and daughter in a road accident.

Eponyms 

Several places and buildings have been named after Marbot:

 Place Marbot, the central square of Beaulieu-sur-Dordogne, department of Corrèze in France.
 Avenue des Généraux Marbot, the principal avenue of Altillac, department of Corrèze in France.
 Hôtel Marbot, a château in Tulle, department of Corrèze in France and seat of the departmental council of Corrèze.
 Marbot Lake, a lake in Baie-James, province of Quebec in Canada.
 Marbot, previous name of the town of Tarik Ibn Ziad, province of Aïn Defla in Algeria.

See also 
 List of French military leaders
 Napoleonic Wars
 Marbot family
 Jean-Antoine Marbot
 Adolphe Marbot

References

Sources 
 
 
 
 Archives nationales (French Ministry of Culture):

Notes

Citations

External links 
 
 Works by Marcellin Marbot at HathiTrust.
 .
 .

1782 births
1854 deaths
Grand Officiers of the Légion d'honneur
Knights of the Order of Saint Louis
Members of the Chamber of Peers of the July Monarchy
French commanders of the Napoleonic Wars
Members of the Chamber of Peers of the Bourbon Restoration
Marcellin
Cavalry commanders
Burials at Père Lachaise Cemetery
19th-century French writers
Barons of the First French Empire
People from Corrèze
French military writers
French lieutenant generals